The Men's Combined in the 2018 FIS Alpine Skiing World Cup involved two events. Peter Fill of Italy won the season title when he finished third in the difficult Alpine combined at Wengen, behind first-time World Cup winner Victor Muffat-Jeandet of France, who ended up third in the discipline for the season. 

The season was interrupted by the 2018 Winter Olympics from 12-24 February 2018 at Yongpyong Alpine Centre (slalom and giant slalom) at the Alpensia Sports Park in PyeongChang and at the Jeongseon Alpine Centre (speed events) in Jeongseon, South Korea.  The men's combined was held on 13 February.

At this time, combined races were not included in the season finals, which were scheduled in 2018 in Åre, Sweden.

Standings

DNS = Did Not Start
DNS2 = Finished run 1; Did Not Start run 2
DNF1 = Did Not Finish run 1
DNF2 = Did Not Finish run 2

See also
 2018 Alpine Skiing World Cup – Men's summary rankings
 2018 Alpine Skiing World Cup – Men's Overall
 2018 Alpine Skiing World Cup – Men's Downhill
 2018 Alpine Skiing World Cup – Men's Super-G
 2018 Alpine Skiing World Cup – Men's Giant Slalom
 2018 Alpine Skiing World Cup – Men's Slalom

References

External links
 Alpine Skiing at FIS website

Men's Combined
FIS Alpine Ski World Cup men's combined discipline titles